Taniec kontra Dance (Eng. Dancing vs. Dance) was a Polish special television series which featured professional dancers from Dancing With The Stars and contestants of So You Think You Can Dance competing for viewers' votes. The show took place on 11 June 2011 in Białystok, which is said to be the Polish capital of dance. The Dancing With The Stars team was mentored by Rafał Maserak and the So You Think You Can Dance team's leader was Patricia Kazadi. The judging panel consisted of Michał Piróg (judge on So You Think You Can Dance), Maja Sablewska (judge on X Factor) and Piotr Galiński (judge on Dancing With The Stars). Piotr Gąsowski, who is the presenter on Dancing With The Stars, presented the show. The competition was won by Dancing With The Stars team.

The teams

Dancing With The Stars team 
 Rafał Maserak (THE LEADER)
 Izabela Janachowska (season 9-12)
 Janja Lesar (season 8-10,12)
 Anna Głogowska (season 1-3,7-8,10-12)
 Magdalena Soszyńska-Michno (season 1-3,5-9,11-12)
 Paulina Biernat (season 11)
 Nina Tyrka (season 7 & 12)
 Robert Rowiński (season 3-4,6,11-12)
 Jan Kliment (season 10-12)
 Stefano Terrazzino (season 4-6,8,11)
 Krzysztof Hulboj (season 8-10,12)
 Michał Uryniuk (season 7)
 Cezary Olszewski (season 7-10,12)

So You Think You Can Dance team 
 Patricia Kazadi (THE LEADER)
 Ilona Bekier (season 5)
 Ada Kawecka (season 3)
 Klaudia Koruba (season 4)
 Anna Kapera (season 4 WINNER)
 Maria Foryś (season 1)
 Leal Zielińska (season 5)
 Marcin Mroziński (season 3)
 Karol Niecikowski (season 3)
 Tomasz Prządka (season 3)
 Adam Kościelniak (season 5)
 Aleksander Paliński (season 5)
 Rafał Kamiński (season 1)

Contest Performances

Guest Performances 
The show featured music performances by X Factor finalists and Patricia Kazadi.

Taniec